Derby is a city in Derbyshire, England.

Derby or The Derby may also refer to:

Places

Australia
 Derby, Tasmania, a town
 Derby, Western Australia, a town
 Derby Highway, Western Australia

Canada
 Derby, British Columbia, a locality
 Derby Parish, New Brunswick
 Derby, New Brunswick, an unincorporated community therein

South Africa
 Derby, North West, a town

United Kingdom
 Derby (UK Parliament constituency), Derbyshire
 Derby (ward), a Metropolitan Borough of Sefton ward, Merseyside
 Diocese of Derby, a Church of England diocese

United States
 Derby, Colorado, a census-designated place
 Derby, Connecticut, a city
 Derby, Ford County, Illinois, an unincorporated community
 Derby, Saline County, Illinois, an unincorporated community
 Derby, Indiana, an unincorporated community
 Derby, Iowa, a city
 Derby, Kansas, a city
 Derby, New York, a hamlet
 Darby Township, Pickaway County, Ohio
 Derby, Ohio, a census-designated place
 Derby, Texas, an unincorporated community
 Derby, Vermont, a town
 Derby, Wise County, Virginia, an unincorporated community and coal town
 Derby Dam, Truckee River, Nevada, United States
 Louisville, Kentucky, nicknamed "Derby City" because it hosts the Kentucky Derby

People
 Derby (surname)
 Derby Carrillo (born 1987), Salvadoran footballer
 Derby Makinka (born 1965-1993), Zambian footballer

Sports

Clubs
 BK Derby, a Swedish association football club located in Linköping, Sweden
 Derby City RLFC, an English rugby league team based in Derby, Derbyshire
 Derby County F.C., an English football club
 Derby RFC, an English rugby union team based in Derby, Derbyshire
 Derby/Linköping BK, a Swedish bandy club located in Linköping, Sweden
 FC Derby, Cape Verde
 SC Derby, Montenegrin basketball club

Specific sports and events 
 Derby (horse race), a race usually restricted to three-year-old horses
 Epsom Derby, also known as the Derby Stakes, the most prestigious of Britain's horse races
 Kentucky Derby, often referred to in the United States as simply "The Derby"
 Local derby, sports match (usually association football) between two rivals that are based in areas of close geographical proximity
 Demolition derby, an intentionally destructive motor sport
 Roller derby, a roller-skating contact sport

Arts and entertainment

Films
 The Derby (1895 film), a British documentary film
 The Derby (1919 film), a German silent mystery sports film
 Derby (1926 film), a German silent film
 Derby (1949 film), a West German horse racing film directed by Roger von Norman and starring Hannelore Schroth
 Derby (1971 film), an American documentary film by Robert Kaylor about the world of 1970s professional roller derby

Music
 Derby mute, a horn mute that resembles a derby hat
 Derby Records, a short-lived American record label

Brands and enterprises
 Derby (French car), a defunct French automobile marque
 Derby (cigarette), a brand name of cigarettes sold in Latin America, particularly Costa Rica
 Derby Cycle, a large German bicycle manufacturer
 Derby Oil Company, a former oil company purchased by the Coastal Corporation in 1988
 Volkswagen Derby, a car
Derby (Canadian automobile), a Canadian automobile built in Saskatchewan between 1924 and 1927
Derby (repair shops), railroad repair facilities in Milo, Maine

Clothing
 Derby, another name for a bowler hat
 Derby shoe, a style of shoe

Food and drink
 Derby (cocktail), a drink with gin, peach bitters and mint leaves
 Derby cheese, a British cheese
 Derby pie, a chocolate and pecan tart with a pastry dough crust

Military
 De Havilland DH.27 Derby, a 1920s biplane bomber that did not reach production
 , a First World War minesweeper
 Derby (missile), a version of the Israeli Python air-to-air missile

Schools
 Derby Academy (disambiguation)
 Derby College, England
 Derby Grammar School, a Church of England secondary school
 Derby High School (disambiguation)
 Derby School, a school in Derby, England, from 1160 to 1989
 University of Derby, England

Other uses
 Apache Derby, Java relational database management system
 Derby Porcelain, a type of English ceramic pottery
 Earl of Derby, a title in the peerage of England
 Derby Racer, two former roller coasters at Revere Beach, Massachusetts
 Derby toadlet, a species of frog

See also 
 Darby (disambiguation)
 Derbyshire